Bieńkówka refers to the following places in Poland:

 Bieńkówka, Kuyavian-Pomeranian Voivodeship
 Bieńkówka, Lesser Poland Voivodeship